Płoska - is a river in east Poland in Podlaskie Voivodeship, a left tributary of the Supraśl River, with a length of 23,6 kilometres and the basin area of 216 km2. There is good river for rafting. The largest tributary is Świniobródka.

Rivers of Poland
Rivers of Podlaskie Voivodeship